Jesús Ángel Turiel de la Cruz (born 6 October 1973) is a Spanish retired footballer who played as a defensive midfielder.

Club career
Turiel was born in Málaga, Andalusia. During his early career, the defensive-minded player with good heading ability represented Real Valladolid (which also loaned him, in 1997–98, to CD Toledo) and Deportivo Alavés – being signed immediately after the 2001 UEFA Cup final– after which he returned to Segunda División, representing Elche CF and Hércules CF.

In the summer of 2007, Turiel joined Segunda División B club Pontevedra CF, being released after two promotionless campaigns. Overall, he appeared in 135 matches each in La Liga and the second level in 12 professional seasons, scoring eight and seven goals respectively.

References

External links

1973 births
Living people
Footballers from Málaga
Spanish footballers
Association football midfielders
La Liga players
Segunda División players
Segunda División B players
Real Valladolid Promesas players
Real Valladolid players
CD Toledo players
Deportivo Alavés players
Elche CF players
Hércules CF players
Pontevedra CF footballers
Spanish football managers